Krista White (born December 19, 1984) is an American fashion model, best known as the winner of Cycle 14 of America's Next Top Model. As part of her win, she was signed with Wilhelmina Models, received a $100,000 contract with Covergirl, and appeared on the cover of Seventeen Magazine.

Early life 
White was born in Pine Bluff, Arkansas. She worked as a retail manager before her stint on ANTM.

Americas Next Top Model
White won the fourteenth cycle of America's Next Top Model. She received four consecutive first call-outs. She was never placed in the bottom two, making her the fourth winner to achieve this record, preceded by winners Jaslene Gonzalez, McKey Sullivan, and Nicole Fox. She won a total of four reward challenges. In the end, she was selected over runner-up Raina Hein, because the judges thought White would have a better chance at an international career.

She has walked the runway for top New York designer Nicole Miller in New Zealand Fashion Week.

White has also modeled for top designer Betsey Johnson and friend Sergio Guadarramo's collection "Celestino Collection".

In 2011, she walked the runway for BET's Rip The Runway.

References

Living people
America's Next Top Model winners
1984 births